Albert Aaron Johnson (January 1, 1880 – May 31, 1963) was an American track and field athlete who competed in the 1904 Summer Olympics. In 1904 he finished sixth in the shot put event as well as sixth in the hammer throw competition.

References

External links
profile

1880 births
1963 deaths
American male shot putters
American male hammer throwers
Olympic track and field athletes of the United States
Athletes (track and field) at the 1904 Summer Olympics